Stan Leonard (1924–1995) was a Welsh footballer, who played as a winger in the Football League for Chester.

References

External links

Chester City F.C. players
Association football wingers
English Football League players
1995 deaths
1924 births
Welsh footballers
People from Hawarden
Sportspeople from Flintshire